Hélio Delmiro (born May 20, 1947) is a Brazilian guitar player and composer.

Delmiro started playing the guitar in early childhood.
Since then, he has played with many of the best Brazilian musicians, among whom are Moacyr Silva, Márcio Montarroyos, Luíz Eça, Elis Regina, Elza Soares and Elizeth Cardoso. With César Camargo Mariano, he recorded in 1981 the album Samambaia, which still holds as a landmark for Brazilian instrumental music.

Discography 
 Emotiva (1980)
 Samambaia (1981) with César Camargo Mariano 
 Chama (1984)
 Romã (1991)
 Symbiosis (1999) with Clare Fischer
 Violão Urbano (2002) 
 Compassos (2004)
With Gato Barbieri
Chapter Two: Hasta Siempre (Impulse!, 1973–74)

References 

1947 births
Brazilian guitarists
Brazilian male guitarists
Living people